Lennart Alexandersson (born 31 March 1947) is a Swedish former footballer who played for Halmstads BK in the 1960s and 1970s. He is the father of football players, Niclas and Daniel Alexandersson.

In 1965, Halmstads was demoted to Division 3. From 1966 to 1968, the team regained their Division 2 status after dominating Division 3 with a goal difference of 87 to 23, a record in the Swedish league system. After Halmstads triumphant return to Division 2, Alexandersson along with three other teammates became the first contracted players for the club.

After his retirement from football, Lennart settled in Falkenberg with his wife and three sons. Two of his sons eventually went on to play for Halmstads BK. His son Niclas helped lead the team to the Svenska Cupen in 1995.  He has two grandchildren from his son Niclas and daughter-in-law Frida named Tilda and Noah.

References

Living people
1947 births
Association football fullbacks
Association football forwards
Swedish footballers
Allsvenskan players
Halmstads BK players